The Battle of Arroyo Grande took place on 6 December 1842 and was a major battle of the Uruguayan Civil War.

Battle
At Arroyo Grande, the federal forces, or blancos, of Manuel Oribe defeated the colorados of Fructuoso Rivera, having been in conflict with them since 1838.

Aftermath
Following the battle, Oribe followed up his victory over the Colorados by marching to and besieging Montevideo thus beginning the Great Siege of Montevideo.

External links
 Arroyo Grande: una batalla sangrienta

See also
 Origin of the Uruguayan Civil War

Conflicts in 1842
Battles of the Uruguayan Civil War
December 1842 events
1842 in Argentina
Arroyo Grande
History of Entre Ríos Province